Ophélie David (née Rácz, born 6 July 1976) is a French freestyle skier specializing in ski cross, an event in which she has won a world championship and four consecutive Winter X Games, as well as having previously been ranked number one in the world in.

David began her career as an alpine skier, competing for Hungary at the 1994 Winter Olympics in both the slalom and the combined, both of which she failed to finish. David was able to compete for Hungary because her father, János Rácz, held Hungarian citizenship and had competed for that country in basketball at the 1964 Summer Olympics.

David qualified to compete in the inaugural Winter Olympic Ski Cross race in Vancouver. She was considered the odds-on favorite for gold due to her long-time dominance in the discipline, but crashed out in the quarterfinals and was placed ninth. She finished in fourth position at Sochi after she fell in the final.

Personal life
David grew up on the island of Corsica, where her retired parents still reside.

She is married to Phil David, who is very supportive of her career. They have a daughter named Lilou, born in 1999 (2000?). The family is very close, making frequent use of Skype while David travels for competitions.

Her hobbies include recreational gymnastics, basketball, windsurfing, traveling, painting, books, and cinema. She is also a competitive mountain biker, her biggest win being the 2008 Megavalanche race. During the summer, she is involved with sports camps for children, and during the winter is a ski instructor.

She speaks French and English.

References

External links

 
 
 
 
 

1976 births
Living people
French female freestyle skiers
Olympic alpine skiers of Hungary
Olympic freestyle skiers of France
Alpine skiers at the 1994 Winter Olympics
Freestyle skiers at the 2010 Winter Olympics
Freestyle skiers at the 2014 Winter Olympics
X Games athletes
People from Cucq
Sportspeople from Pas-de-Calais
French people of Hungarian descent